Ellen Eliza Fitz was an American inventor known for her design for a globe mounting system, the Fitz globe.

Early life 
Fitz was born in 1835 in Kingston, New Hampshire. She moved to Massachusetts as a child and grew up in Lynnfield and Newton. As a teenager, she spent most of her time translating classical texts, such as the Eclogues of Virgil and publishing poetry. In 1853, Fitz graduated from the West Newton State Normal School. After this, she worked as a music teacher in Cambridge, Massachusetts. She had also developed an interest in mapmaking. 
As an adult, Fitz spent the majority of her time in Saint John, New Brunswick, Canada, where she worked as a governess and educator.  She was recognized as a governess for her language and translating abilities. It was while she was in New Brunswick that her ideas for design and manufacturing for the globe and globe mounting began.

The Fitz Globe 

In 1875, Fitz was given the patent for the globe mounting system of vertical rings. This mounted globe was then known as the ‘Fitz Globe’. The included vertical rings portrayed the change from day to night through all four seasons. Besides this, the actual globes that were used with the Fitz mounting were mid-19th century globes. The purpose of this new mounting system was to facilitate students’ understanding of the Earth’s daily rotation and annual revolution and was a design intended for educators to use in the classroom.   The Fitz globe was published as a 12-inch globe by the textbook firm, Ginn and Heath, and was displayed at the 1876 Centennial Exhibition in Philadelphia. To accompany this, Fitz wrote and published a guidebook to the Fitz globe, “Handbook of the Terrestrial Globe or Guide to Fitz’s New Method of Mounting and Operating Globes”, to promote her invention. Within the guidebook, Fitz includes student exercises on the topics of geometry, geography, and astronomy, along with a description of the globe mount. 
Examples of exercises included in the guidebook:
1.	Find the difference in longitude between New York and San Francisco.
2.	At what rate per hour are the inhabitants of Botany Bay carried from west to east by the rotation of the earth on its axis?
3.	Bring Washington into 9 o’clock A.M.
4.	Find the difference of time between Boston and Rome.
5.	Find the times of sunrise and sunset, and the lengths of the day and the night, at Paris upon May 14.
After receiving her first patent of the Fitz globe, Fitz continued her intellectual journey and received a second patent. This second patent was granted in 1882, and was another mounting system to indicate the positions of stars above the horizon at any time of the year.

Death and legacy  
Fitz died at the age of 51 in 1886, 4 years after she received her second patent. She died from an unspecified long illness in Watertown, Massachusetts. 
Fitz’s legacy continued until the late 19th century and early 20th century. During this time the Education Reform still had momentum, and “object teaching” was being promoted, to allow students to learn through the use of their senses and the interaction of objects. Due to this, the globe has become an important object when teaching.

Selected publications

References

Further reading 

Globe as a Gift: All You Need to Know

1835 births
1886 deaths
American cartographers
Women inventors